Chingizovo (Sıñğıź) is a rural locality (a village) in Tavlykayevsky Selsoviet, Baymaksky District, Bashkortostan, Russia. The population was 573 as of 2010. There are 9 streets.

Geography 
Chingizovo is located 32 km northwest of Baymak (the district's administrative centre) by road. Buranbayevo is the nearest rural locality.

References 

Rural localities in Baymaksky District